Afroinsectivora is a clade of mammals that includes the macroscelideans and afrosoricidans. This clade includes the elephant shrews, golden moles and tenrecs.

Phylogeny

Classification
 clade Afroinsectivora
 order Macroscelidea
 Macroscelididae
Elephant shrew
 order Afrosoricida
 Chrysochloridae
Golden mole
 Tenrecidae
 Tenrec

Notes

References
 

Mammal unranked clades